King Neptune is a 1932 cartoon by Walt Disney, the second in the Silly Symphonies series produced in Technicolor. While Flowers and Trees was originally intended as a black and white cartoon, King Neptune was meant to be in colors already from the start, and was able to take full advantage of this.

While the film is included in the 1980s VHS release of Silly Symphonies and the Walt Disney Treasures DVD, it was not selected for the Platinum Edition DVD collection, because of mermaid nudity and heavy drinking (due to the film was targeting adult audiences). While the mermaids lack anatomical detail, they may be considered inappropriate for a modern audience.

Plot 
King Neptune is holding court at the bottom of the ocean, being entertained by his various sea creature subjects. His favorites are a gaggle of mermaids (all brunettes with the exception of a single strawberry-blonde) who appear hand-sized next to the larger-than-life king. Once dismissed from the king's presence, the mermaids surface to lounge on a rock and relax. They are spotted by a band of lecherous pirates who attempt to capture them using a lasso. The mermaids all escape apart from the strawberry blonde who is lassoed and pulled onto the ship of jeering pirates. The frightened young mermaid is then attacked by the cruel pirates, jumping on her and pulling her hair, though she does a good job of fending them off. 
Enraged that one of his most beloved subjects has been taken hostage and suffering, King Neptune launches an assault on the pirates and a fantastic naval battle ensues. The sea creatures work together to mimic such war machines as airplanes and bombs, submarine torpedoes, and other such modern equipment. During the attack one pirate drags the mermaid and puts her into a treasure chest to keep as a valuable. The pirates do a fair job of fending off their attackers, so Neptune rises to the surface and summons a storm while stirring up huge whirlpools with his trident. In the end, he jumps on top of the pirate ship, plunging it straight to the bottom of the ocean.

There is no trace of the pirates except a single chest that begins to jump around on its own. The ginger mermaid pops out of it, decked in gold and pearls. Her friends hurry to festoon themselves with jewelry and they perform another beautiful water ballet for King Neptune's pleasure.

Production 
According to the DVD of Walt Disney Treasures: More Silly Symphonies, Volume Two,
 Two scenes of the short, involving a whale hovercraft carrier and some octopus-helicopters, were animated by Dave Hand, who would go on to direct 1943's Victory Through Air Power.
 The design of King Neptune is actually a 1930s Disney archetype. Disney would use the same design for Santa in another 1932 Silly Symphony called Santa's Workshop, again in the 1933 Silly Symphony The Night Before Christmas and Father Noah in Father Noah's Ark (1933).

Impact 
In 1933, Blue Ribbon Books published The Pop-Up Silly Symphonies, a pop-up book featuring full-color illustrations inspired by King Neptune and Babes in the Woods.

Disney used the character of King Neptune again, in the 1936 Mickey Mouse short Thru the Mirror, as well as in The Cold-Blooded Penguin, a segment in the 1945 film The Three Caballeros.

The director of the short, Burt Gillett, used a similar character design for King Neptune in a 1936 Felix the Cat cartoon, the Van Beuren Rainbow Parade Neptune's Nonsense.

Several elements of this short (particularly Neptune's attack on the pirates) later served as reference for the final battle in the 1989 film The Little Mermaid.

Voice cast 
 King Neptune: Allan Watson
 Mermaids: Marcellite Garner

Home media 
The short was released on December 19, 2006 on Walt Disney Treasures: More Silly Symphonies, Volume Two in the "From the Vault" section, because of mermaid nudity and heavy drinking (due to the short was targeting adult audiences).

References

External links 
 

1932 films
1932 short films
1930s color films
Silly Symphonies
1930s Disney animated short films
1932 animated films
1932 adventure films
Films directed by Burt Gillett
Films produced by Walt Disney
Films about mermaids
Animated films based on classical mythology
Pirate films
Sea adventure films
Neptune (mythology)
1930s American films